11887 Echemmon  is a Jupiter trojan from the Trojan camp, approximately  in diameter. It was discovered on 14 October 1990, by German astronomers Freimut Börngen and Lutz Schmadel at the Karl Schwarzschild Observatory in Tautenburg, Germany. The dark Jovian asteroid has a rotation period of 8.5 hours. It was named after the Trojan hero Echemmon from Greek mythology.

Orbit and classification 

As all Jupiter trojans, Echemmon is in a 1:1 orbital resonance with Jupiter. It is located in the trailering Trojan camp at the Gas Giant's  Lagrangian point, 60° behind its orbit . It is also a non-family asteroid of the Jovian background population.

It orbits the Sun at a distance of 4.7–5.7 AU once every 11 years and 10 months (4,309 days; semi-major axis of 5.18 AU). Its orbit has an eccentricity of 0.09 and an inclination of 24° with respect to the ecliptic.

The body's observation arc begins with a precovery taken at the Palomar Observatory in November 1954, nearly 36 years prior to its official discovery observation at Tautenburg.

Naming 

This minor planet was named from Greek mythology after the Trojan prince Echemmon, one of the many sons of King Priam of Troy. He was slain together with his brother Chromius by Diomedes, king of Argos, during the Trojan War. The name was suggested by the first discoverer, Freimut Börngen, and published by the Minor Planet Center on 9 March 2001.

Physical characteristics 

Echemmon is an assumed C-type asteroid, while most larger Jupiter trojans are D-types.

Rotation period 

In November 2013, a rotational lightcurve of Echemmon was obtained over three nights of photometric observations by Robert Stephens at the Center for Solar System Studies in Landers, California. Lightcurve analysis gave a rotation period of  hours with a brightness amplitude of 0.15 magnitude.

Diameter and albedo 

According to the survey carried out by the NEOWISE mission of NASA's Wide-field Infrared Survey Explorer, Echemmon measures 31.19 kilometers in diameter and its surface has an albedo of 0.095, while the Collaborative Asteroid Lightcurve Link assumes a standard albedo for a carbonaceous asteroid of 0.057 and calculates a diameter of 38.51 kilometers based on an absolute magnitude of 10.8.

Notes

References

External links 
 Asteroid Lightcurve Database (LCDB), query form (info )
 Dictionary of Minor Planet Names, Google books
 Discovery Circumstances: Numbered Minor Planets (10001)-(15000) – Minor Planet Center
 Asteroid 11887 Echemmon at the Small Bodies Data Ferret
 
 

011887
Discoveries by Freimut Börngen
Discoveries by Lutz D. Schmadel
Named minor planets
19901014